Cesarani is the name of:
David Cesarani (1956–2015), English historian who specialised in Jewish history
Sal Cesarani (1939–), American fashion designer